Fareed Ali Al-Marzouqi (born 22 December 1965) is an Emirati football referee.
Al-Marzouqi became a FIFA referee in 2008. He was judged at the 15th Arabian Gulf Cup in 2002, and managed the Qatar national football team and the Kuwait national football team on January 26, 2002.

References

1965 births
Emirati football referees
Living people
AFC Asian Cup referees